Nomeh Unateze is a town in Nkanu-East local government area of Enugu state. It has a population of about ten thousand citizens. The town is bordered on the North by Ugbawka, on the north east by Mburubu, Oduma on the south east and Nenwe on the south west. Their main language is the Ibo language but up to 70% of its populace are educated. Nomeh is known for its agricultural produce, especially rice, yam, cassava, palm oil and various types of vegetables.

Nomeh Unateze has two major villages namely, Amaokoro and Amaigbo. The sub-villages included in the two above are: Imeama, Amukabi, Uhuafor, Uhuorji, Obinagu, Umuene. The traditional ruler of Nomeh is Igwe Colonel I.O. Mbah (rtd.) A member of the Enugu state council of traditional rulers.

A tourist that wants to visit Nomeh from outside Nigeria will have to land at the airport in Enugu town, go on a car through the Enugu-Port Harcout express road and turn left at the four corner junction Ozalla. After tuning left you will need to go straight to Obe, down to Umueze, Agbani, turn right at Agbani after the rail line and go down to Ugbawka. After Ugbawka, there is Nara town, the home of Igwe Nathan Ogbu, the Unateze 1 of Nara town. After the town of Nara, the tourist should turn to the right and head to Mburubu, immediately after Mburubu, there lies the ancient town of Nomeh.

According to legend handed down through the ages, a certain man named Unateze, who lived in the present day Unateze is the father of two sons. One is named Nomeh while the second son is Nara. That is why the two town still bear the name (Nomeh Unateze and Nara Unateze). Both towns share a common ancestry and some striking similarities in culture. A river, known as Nvuna snaked through all the villages of Nomeh, providing drinking water as well as aquatic environment that supports an all year round farming though irrigation.

There is a railway network that passed through the south east part of Nigeria and Nomeh town is one of the towns where the trains stop. Nomeh shares common boundaries with the towns of Ugbawka (precisely Amankwo village in Ugbawka), and Nenweh

See also

Towns in Enugu State